The following lists events that happened in 2003 in Iceland.

Incumbents
President – Ólafur Ragnar Grímsson 
Prime Minister – Davíð Oddsson

Events

May
 May 10 - A parliamentary election was held in Iceland.
 May 23 - The fourth cabinet of Davíð Oddsson was formed.

 
2000s in Iceland
Iceland
Iceland
Years of the 21st century in Iceland